Forgive is the second studio album by American country music artist Rebecca Lynn Howard. The album was released in September 2002 by MCA Nashville. The only single released from the project, the title track, peaked at number 12 on the Billboard Hot Country Singles & Tracks chart, and was her only Top 40 country hit. Songwriter Trey Bruce produced 11 of the album's 12 tracks, working with Mark Wright on the title track, while Steve Fishell produced "Jesus and Bartenders".

"Jesus and Bartenders" was later recorded by Daryle Singletary, who released it in 2008 as a single from his album Straight from the Heart. It was originally recorded by Larry Cordle on his album Murder on Music Row.

Track listing

Personnel
Compiled from liner notes.

Musicians on all tracks except "Jesus and Bartenders"
 Trey Bruce – programming
 Pat Buchanan – electric guitar
 Lisa Cochran – background vocals
 J. T. Corenflos – electric guitar, acoustic guitar, gut string guitar
 Melodie Crittenden – background vocals
 Tony Harrell – piano, Hammond B-3 organ, Mellotron, accordion, Wurlitzer electric piano
 Wes Hightower – background vocals
 Steve Hinson – steel guitar, Dobro
 Rebecca Lynn Howard – lead vocals 
 Greg Morrow – drums
 Alison Prestwood – bass guitar
 Chris Rodriguez – background vocals
 Brian Siewert – synthesizer
 Marty Slayton – background vocals
 Michael Spriggs – acoustic guitar, bouzouki
 Neil Thrasher – background vocals
 Jonathan Yudkin – mandolin, fiddle, Jew's harp, banjo, cello, viola, harp, orchestra bells

Strings on "Forgive": Carolyn Bailey, Christopher Farrell, Lynn Peithman, Alison Gooding, Erin Hall, Beverly Duker, Shu-Zheng Yang, Julia Tanner, David Reneau, Denise Baker, Melinda Bootz, and Jeremy Williams

Musicians on "Jesus and Bartenders"
 Kenny Aronoff – drums
 Dan Dugmore – acoustic guitar
 Steve Fishell – steel guitar
 Johnny Hiland – lead guitar
 John Barlow Jarvis – piano
 Michael Joyce – bass guitar
 Troy Lancaster – electric guitar
 Rick Vito – electric guitar
 Jonathan Yudkin – fiddle

Technical
 Chuck Ainlay – recording ("Jesus and Bartenders" only)
 Trey Bruce – production (except "Jesus and Bartenders")
 David Buchanan – recording (except "Jesus and Bartenders")
 Steve Fishell – production ("Jesus and Bartenders" only)
 Kelly Geidt – production coordination
 Todd Gunnerson – recording assistant (except "Forgive" and "Jesus and Bartenders")
 Erik Jaskowiak – recording assistant ("Jesus and Bartenders" only)
 Heather Kennel – production coordination
 Brian Siewert – string arrangement on "Forgive"
 Joey Turner – recording assistant ("Forgive" only)
 Jon Van Nest – mixing
 Ronnie Thomas – editing
 Hank Williams – mastering
 Mark Wright – production ("Forgive" only)

Charts

Weekly charts

Year-end charts

References

2002 albums
Rebecca Lynn Howard albums
MCA Records albums